Double Denim Records is an English independent record label, launched in 2010 by Jack Thomas and Hari Ashurst-Venn.

Back catalogue

References

2010 establishments in England
British independent record labels
Record labels based in London
Record labels established in 2010